Pontecchio Polesine is a comune (municipality) in the Province of Rovigo in the Italian region Veneto, located about  southwest of Venice and about  southeast of Rovigo.

The municipality of Pontecchio Polesine contains the frazioni (subdivisions, mainly villages and hamlets) Borgo, Busi, Ca'Zanforlin, Chiaviche Roncagalle, L'Olmo, and Selva.

Pontecchio Polesine borders the following municipalities: Bosaro, Crespino, Guarda Veneta, Rovigo.

Demographic evolution

Notable persons 
Adelmo Landini was born in Pontecchio Polesine in 1896.  He moved to Bologna to obtain a technical license, and later served in the Italian army during World War I.  Landini died in August 1965, and the Municipality of Sasso named a street for him near the Marconi Museum and Mausoleum.

References

Cities and towns in Veneto
Veneto
Geography of Italy